Barbara Gladys Hardy,  (née Nathan; 27 June 1924 – 12 February 2016) was a British literary scholar, author, and poet. As an academic, she specialised in the literature of the 19th Century. From 1965 to 1970, she was Professor of English at Royal Holloway College, University of London. Then, from 1970 to 1989, she was Professor of English Literature at Birkbeck College, University of London.

Early life and education
Hardy was born on 27 June 1924 in Swansea, Wales. Her father was Maurice Nathan, a tobacconist, and her mother was Gladys Emily Ann, née Abraham.

She was educated at Swansea High School for Girls, a grammar school. In February 1941, she experienced the Swansea Blitz. She studied at University College London, graduating with a Bachelor of Arts (BA) degree in 1947 and a Master of Arts (MA) degree in 1949.

On 16 March 1946, she married Ernest Dawson Hardy, a civil servant at the Inland Revenue. They had two children, Kate and Julia.

Honours
In 1962, Hardy was awarded the Rose Mary Crawshay Prize by the British Academy for her monograph The Novels of George Eliot. In 1988 she delivered the British Academy's Sarah Tryphena Phillips Lecture in American Literature and History. In 1997, she was awarded the Sagittarius Prize by the Society of Authors for her novel London Lovers. She was elected a Fellow of the Royal Society of Literature (FRSL) in 1997, and a Senior Fellow of the British Academy (FBA) in 2006.

Selected works
 Academic
 
 
 
 
 

 Personal
 
 

Poetry
Dante's Ghosts (Paekakariki Press, 2013)

References

1924 births
2016 deaths
British academics of English literature
20th-century British poets
20th-century British novelists
Academics of Royal Holloway, University of London
Academics of Birkbeck, University of London
Fellows of the British Academy
Fellows of the Royal Society of Literature
People from Swansea
Alumni of University College London
20th-century British women writers
Women literary historians
British women historians